Botryolepraria neotropica is a species of saxicolous (rock-dwelling), byssoid (cottony) lichen in the order Verrucariales. It was formally described as a new species in 2010 by Martin Kukwa and Sergio Pérez-Ortega. The type specimen was collected growing with liverworts on shaded vertical walls in El Yunque (Guantánamo province, Cuba). It also occurs in Bolivia and Peru, where it grows in shaded and damp locations. The species epithet refers to its Neotropical distribution. It is the second member of Botryolepraria, a genus circumscribed in 1997.

Although similar in external morphology, Botryolepraria neotropica can be distinguished from B. lesdainii by its larger granules (about 200 μm in diameter, about twice that of B. lesdainii). Additionally, B. neotropica does not produce the lichen product lesdainin, but only makes zeorin.

References

Verrucariales
Lichens described in 2010
Lichen species
Lichens of Bolivia
Lichens of Peru
Lichens of the Caribbean